Bao Chaudhry Akhtar Ali is a Pakistani politician who had been a member of the Provincial Assembly of the Punjab from August 2018 till January 2023.

Political career

Chauhdary Akhtar Ali Elected in 2013, MPA Punjab Assembly on 2013 for a five-year term till 2018 as a candidate from Pakistan Muslim League Nawaz. He was again elected to the Provincial Assembly of the Punjab as a candidate of Pakistan Muslim League (N) from Constituency PP-154 (Lahore-XI) in 2018 Pakistani general election.

References

Living people
Pakistan Muslim League (N) MPAs (Punjab)
Year of birth missing (living people)